Black Mountain (Tor Ghar), is located in Hazara division of the Khyber Pakhtunkhwa province of Pakistan. Tor Ghar is Pushto word which means Tor (Black) Ghar (Mountain). It is also called Kala Dhaka, which means the same as its Pushto name; in Hindko a local language spoken by the people of Tanawal and Agror which are located on eastern side of Tor Ghar, however, the original name of this mountain is Tor Ghar. Tor Ghar lies to the east of the River Indus from Thakot to Darband. The total length of this mountain is about twenty five to thirty miles and its average height about 8000 feet above sea level. It ascends from the Indus basin at its southern end near the village of Kiara and goes up to its watershed near the village Baradar; then it runs north-east by north to the point on the crest known as Chitabat. From here the range runs due north, finally descending to the Indus by two large spurs, at the foot of the easternmost of which lies Thakot. The Indus, after passing Thakot, turns westward along the northern foot of the mountain until it washes the western of the two aforementioned spurs, when it takes a sharp bend to the south, and runs below and parallel to the western foot of this mountain range.

Boundaries
Tor Ghar is bounded on the south by Tanawal; on the east by Agror, Pariari, Tikari, Nandihar and Deshi; on the northern extremity lies the River Indus and Thakot; and on the west, between the crest and the River Indus. These slopes fall steeply from the crest for some 2000 feet; then follows a zone of gentle, well-cultivated slopes; and then from 4000 to 5000 feet altitude the hill drops precipitously to the Indus. The actual Indus Valley here varies in width from a few hundred yards to nearly two miles, being narrowest at Kotkai and at its broadest at Palosi. It is crossed at about eleven different points by ferries, the boats holding from twenty to thirty passengers, but the inhabitants pass over the river almost everywhere on inflated skins.

Mountain 
The Black Mountain (Tor Ghar) lies between 34º32' and 34º50' N, and 72º48' and 72º58' E. The mountain may be described as a long, narrow ridge with higher peaks at intervals, and occasional deep passes; the general outline of the crest is more rounded than sharp. The numerous large spurs projecting from the sides are often precipitous and rocky, with deep, narrow glens or gorges lying between them, in which are some of the smaller villages of the tribes, the larger ones being, as a rule, situated on the banks of the Indus. The whole of the upper portion of the mountain is thickly wooded, with pine, oak, sycamore, horse-chestnut and wild cherry. The crest of the mountain is crossed by several passes.

Climate
The climate of Tor Ghar (Black Mountain) is very fine in spring and autumn but winters are very severe because of the snowfall in sufficient quantity which stops communication over the crest. From proximity of the mountain to the Sulky valley of the Indus, the heat in summer even at the highest elevation is nearly as warm as that of the plains. Heavy rain generally falls in the spring and early autumn and storms frequently occur.

Principal Tribes  
The western slope of Tor Ghar is inhabited by following clans of the Yousafzai Pashtun Tribe:-

 Mada Khel.
 Hassanzai.
 Akazai.
 Chagharzai.

Isa the second son of Yousaf (Yousafzai) had three sons; Mada, Hassan and Aka. The Mada Khels, Hassanzais and Akazais are their descendants. Whereas, the Chagarzais are the descendants of Chagar who was one of the son of Mali (Malizai). Mali (Malizai) was one of the brother of Isa (Isazai). These sub-clans have been described in detail in the succeeding paragraphs.

Mada Khel
Mada Khel is a division of the Isazai clan of Yousafzai tribe. They are among the dwellers on the Black Mountain. The Mada Khel country is on the northern slopes of the Mahaban Mountain down to the right bank of the Indus, and is bounded on the north by the Hassanzais, on the east by the Indus, and on the south and west by the Tanolis and Amazais. Most of the villages are on the Mahaban Mountain, only two being on the banks of the Indus. The easiest approaches to Mada Khel territory pass through the Hassanzai territory.
Mada Khels are further divided into following Sections and Sub-sections:-.

Hassanzai
The Hassanzais are a division of the Isazai clan of Yousafzai tribe and live on either side of the Indus; those cis-Indus occupy the most southern portion of the western slopes of Tor Ghar, while those trans-Indus live immediately opposite to them. The former area is bounded on the north and east by the Akazais, on the west by the Indus, and on the south by the Hassanzai border which adjoins the territory of Tanawal, the former state of Amb.

The Hassanzais are further divided into following ten Sections:-.

Akazai
Like other divisions of Isazai clan of Yousafzai tribe, the Akazais inhibit a portion of the crest and western slopes of the  Tor Ghar; to the north of Hassanzais having on the east a part of Agror and Piriarey; to the North Chagharzais (Nasrat Khel and Basi Khel) and to the West the Indus. The southern face of Machai Sar (Peak) belongs to Akazais, which is the highest peak of Tor Ghar. Their main villages are Kand (Upper and Lower), Bimbal and Bilianrey. Other Akazai villages are Darbanrey, Kanar, Bakrey, Laid, Lashora, Bakianra, Moraata, Torum and Larey. During the Sikh Rule and up to 1868 Akazais held the village of Shahtut in Agror valley (Tehsil Oghi).

Akazais are further divided into following Sections and Sub-sections:-.

Chagharzai
The Chagharzais or Chagarzais are a division of the Malizai clan of the Yousafzai tribes. They are the descendants of Chaghar (Chagharzai) the son of Mali (Malizai) who was one of the sons of Yousaf (Yousafzai). They occupy the country on either side of the River Indus, those cis-Indus being located on the western slopes of Tor Ghar, to the north of the Akazais. They are divided into three sub-divisions. The southern boundary of the cis-Indus Chagharzais is contiguous with that of the Akazais, and follows the spur of the Tor Ghar running from the Machai Sar (peak) to the Indus bank — the southern face of the spur belonging to the Akazais and the northern to the Chagharzais. On the west and north, the Indus forms the boundary, while on the east the Chagarzais are bounded by the  territory of the Deshiwals, a clan of the Swati tribe and of the Pariari Saiyids.

The three Chagharzai sub-divisions are further divided into following Sections and Sub-sections:-.

The 'Black Mountain Campaigns' by the British 
The Black Mountain (Tor Ghar) Tribes had never been under direct British Rule, although it was generally accounted to be part of the 'Frontier Region/Provincial Tribal Areas' from circa 1901 onwards and nominally attached to the then Hazara district. The tribes had been involved in fighting with British for quite some time, and a number of famous 'Black Mountain Expeditions' or 'Campaigns' took place between 1852 and the 1920s. Brief account of the British Expeditions against the 
Tor Ghar Tribes is as under:-

Under Lieutenant Colonel Frederick Mackeson, 1852–53. The occasion was the murder of two British customs officers. A force of 3800 British troops traversed their country, destroying their villages, grain and crops.
Under Major-General Alfred Thomas Wilde, 1868. The occasion was an attack on a British police post at Oghi in the Agror Valley by all three tribes. A force of 12,544 British troops entered the country and the tribes made peace.
The First Hazara Expedition 1888. The cause was the constant raids made by the tribes on villages in British territory, culminating in an attack on a small British detachment, in which two English officers were killed. A force of 9416 British troops traversed the country of the tribes, and severely punished them.
The Second Hazara Expedition, 1891. The Black Mountain tribes fired on a force within British limits. A force of 7300 British troops traversed the country. The tribesmen made peace and entered into an agreement with the government to preserve the peace of the border.
The Black Mountain (Tor Ghar) Tribes provided the following fighting men for famous Umbeyla Operation of December 1863:-
   Hassanzai      : 2000
   Akazai         : 1000
   Mada Khel      : 4000
   Chagharzai     : 6000

Tor Ghar becomes the 25th district of Khyber Pakhtoonkhwa
After the creation of Pakistan on 14 August 1947, Tor Ghar was given the formal status of a 'Provincially Administered Tribal Area' (PATA). Since then it has been under the administrative control of Khyber Pakhtoonkhwa, then North-West Frontier Province. Tor Ghar became the 25th District of Khyber Pakhtoonkhwa on 28 January 2011,
Judba is the capital of this newly born district with following tehsils:-
 Judba.
 Kandar Hassanzai.
 Mada Khel.

References 

Social groups of Pakistan
Yusufzai Pashtun tribes